Katherine Eban (born 1966/1967) is an American investigative journalist and author. Her investigative work has focused on public health and homeland security issues. She is a contributor at Fortune magazine and Vanity Fair and writes for a variety of other national magazines.

Biography
Eban is the daughter of Elinor (née Fuchs) and Michael O. Finkelstein. Her father is a corporate lawyer and her mother a professor at the Yale School of Drama. She holds degrees from Brown University, University of East Anglia and a MPhil in English Literature from the University of Oxford where she was a Rhodes Scholar. She is an Andrew Carnegie fellow.

Eban has written two books. Dangerous Doses: How Counterfeiters are Contaminating America's Drug Supply was one of the Best Books of 2005 according to Kirkus Reviews. In 2019 Bottle of Lies: The Inside Story of the Generic Drug Boom was published. She has received grants from the Alfred P. Sloan Foundation to support her books. Bottle of Lies won the Cornelius Ryan Award from the Overseas Press Club of America.

The 2019 film The Report is partly inspired by her "Rorschach and Awe" article in Vanity Fair.

In 2002, she married B. Kenneth Levenson II in a Jewish ceremony at the Angel Orensanz Center in Manhattan.

She is based in Brooklyn, New York.

Bibliography

Books

Essays and reporting

References

1960s births
Living people
20th-century American women writers
20th-century American journalists
Alumni of the University of East Anglia
American women journalists
Brown University alumni
American Rhodes Scholars
Vanity Fair (magazine) people
21st-century American women writers
21st-century American journalists